Joseph Henry Cummins (8 April 1910 – 1992) was an English professional footballer who made one Football League appearance for Southampton in 1934.

Football career
Cummins was born in Plympton, Devon but started his football career on the Channel Islands with Jersey Wanderers. In November 1933, he was signed by Southampton, of the Football League Second Division as a full back.

He spent most of his time at the Saints playing for the reserves, but on 9 April 1934 (the day after his 24th birthday) he was called into the first team to play at inside right in place of Tom Brewis away to Millwall., Cummins was injured early in the game and had to play as a "passenger" for the remainder of the match, which ended in a 1–0 defeat.

In the summer of 1934, he moved to Roubaix in northern France to play for US Tourcoing, although he soon returned to England.

Later career
He later settled in Hampshire to work for the Ordnance Survey, although he played non-league football on the Isle of Wight for Newport.

References

External links
Career details on www.11v11.com

1910 births
1992 deaths
Footballers from Plymouth, Devon
English footballers
Southampton F.C. players
Newport (IOW) F.C. players
English Football League players
Association football forwards